A European Championship is the top level international sports competition between European athletes or sports teams representing their respective countries or professional sports clubs. 

In the plural, the European Championships also refers to a specific combined quadrennial multi-sport event featuring the continental championships for athletics, aquatics, artistic gymnastics, triathlon, rowing, cycling and team golf.

Since European championships are usually open for teams or individual athletes from countries which are members of European sports organisations and some member countries are only partly or not at all situated in the European continent, some non-Europeans also usually take part in these championships.

Games 
 European Games
 European Championships (multi-sport event)
 European Youth Olympic Festival
 European Masters Games
 Winter X Games Europe

Championships 

Aquatics and water sports
 LEN European Aquatics Championships 
 European Short Course Swimming Championships
 European Water Polo Championship
 European Diving Championships
 European Masters Swimming Championships
 European Junior Swimming Championships
 World Para Swimming European Championships

Athletics
 European Athletics Championships
 European Athletics Indoor Championships
 European Athletics U23 Championships
 European Athletics U20 Championships
 European Athletics U18 Championships
 European Mountain Running Championships
 World Para Athletics European Championships

Australian rules football
 EU Cup
 AFL Europe Championship

Auto racing
 AIACR European Championship (1931–1939)
 European Formula Two Championship (1967–1984)
 European Touring Car Championship (1963–1988; 2000–2004)
 European Rally Championship
 FIA European Rallycross Championship
 FIA GT3 European Championship

Badminton
 European Badminton Championships

Baseball
 European Baseball Championship
 Women's European Baseball Championship

Bandy
 European Bandy Championships (1913)

Basketball
 EuroBasket
 EuroBasket Women

Biathlon
 Biathlon European Championships

Boxing
 European Amateur Boxing Championships

Brazilian jiu-jitsu
 European Championship (Brazilian jiu-jitsu)

Canoeing

 Canoe Sprint European Championships
 European Canoe Slalom Championships

Chess
 European Individual Chess Championship

Cricket
 European Cricket Championship
 European Twenty20 Championship
 Women's European Cricket Championship
 European Affiliates Championship

Curling
 European Curling Championships

Cycling
BMX: European BMX Championships
Cyclo-cross: European Cyclo-cross Championships
Mountain bike: European Mountain Bike Championships
Road cycling: European Road Championships
Track cycling: UEC European Track Championships

Darts
 European Championship (darts)

Dragon Boat
European Dragon Boat Championships 

Equestrian
 European Dressage Championships
 European Eventing Championships
 European Show Jumping Championships

Fencing
 World Fencing Championships, open only to European fencers from 1921 to 1937
 European Fencing Championships (1981–)

Field hockey
 Men's EuroHockey Championship
 Women's EuroHockey Championship

Figure skating
 European Figure Skating Championships

Fistball
 Fistball European Championships

Football and Beach Soccer
 UEFA European Championship
 UEFA Women's Championship
 Euro Beach Soccer League

Futsal
 UEFA Futsal Championship
 UEFA Women's Futsal Championship
 UEFS Futsal Championship

Go
 European Go Championship

Gymnastics
 Aerobic Gymnastics European Championships
 European Acrobatics Championships
 European Men's Artistic Gymnastics Championships
 European TeamGym Championships
 European Trampoline Championships
 European Women's Artistic Gymnastics Championships
 Rhythmic Gymnastics European Championships

Handball and Beach Handball
 European Men's Handball Championship
 European Women's Handball Championship
 European Beach Handball Championship
 European Wheelchair Handball Nations’ Tournament

Ice hockey
 Ice Hockey European Championships

Ice sledge hockey
 IPC Ice Sledge Hockey European Championships

Indoor hockey
 Men's EuroHockey Indoor Championship
 Women's EuroHockey Indoor Championship

Judo
 European Judo Championships

Karate
 European Karate Championships

Kickboxing
 W.A.K.O. Amateur European Kickboxing Championships

Korfball
 European Korfball Championship

Long track speed skating
 European Speed Skating Championships

Minifootball
 EMF miniEURO

Multi-Sport
 European Championships
 European Games
 European Youth Olympic Festival

Pétanque
 European Pétanque Championships

Pitch and putt
 European Pitch and putt Championship

Professional Wrestling
 WWE European Championship

Quidditch
European Games (quidditch)

Racquetball
 European Racquetball Championships

Rink hockey
 Rink Hockey European Championship

Rowing
 European Rowing Championships

Rugby league
 Rugby League European Championship

Rugby union
 Rugby Europe International Championships 

Sailing
 European Sailing Championships

Savate
 European Savate Championships

Shooting
 European Shooting Championships

Snooker
 EBSA European Snooker Championship

Softball
 European Softball Championship

Speedway
 Individual Speedway European Championship
 European Pairs Speedway Championship
 European Speedway Club Champions' Cup

Ski mountaineering
 European Championships of Ski Mountaineering

Sumo
 European Sumo Championships

Table tennis
 European Table Tennis Championships
 European Para Table Tennis Championships

Taekwondo
 European Taekwondo Championships

Triathlon
 European Triathlon Championships

Volleyball and Beach Volleyball
 Men's European Volleyball Championship
 Women's European Volleyball Championship
 European Beach Volleyball Championships

Weightlifting
 European Weightlifting Championships

Wheelchair rugby
 IWRF European Championship

Wrestling
 European Wrestling Championships

Winter Sports 
 European Figure Skating Championships
 European Speed Skating Championships
 European Short Track Speed Skating Championships
 FIL European Luge Championships
 Bobsleigh and Skeleton European Championship
 Biathlon European Championships
 European Championships of Ski Mountaineering
 European Ski Orienteering Championships
 European Curling Championships
 Ice Hockey European Championships
 
 
 FIS Alpine Ski Europa Cup
 European Ski Marathon Championships
 European Snow Volleyball Championships (CEV EuroSnowVolley)
 European Bandy Championships
 European Winter Triathlon Championships
 European Ice Climbing Championships
 European Snowshoe Championships
 
 European Rollerski Championships
 European Snowcross Championship
 European Snowmobile Championship - Snowmobile Enduro European Cup

See also 
 Championship
 Eurogames (disambiguation)
 European Games, a multi-sport event between competitors from all nations in Europe
 European Junior Championships (disambiguation)
 European Open (disambiguation)
 European Masters (disambiguation)
 World championship
 African Championship
 Asian Championship
 Oceania Championship
 Pan American Championship
 Central American Championships (disambiguation)
 North American Championship
 South American Championship